Dijan (also Romanized as Dījān; also known as Bīchān and Dīchān) is a village in Alan Baraghush Rural District, Mehraban District, Sarab County, East Azerbaijan Province, Iran. At the 2006 census, its population was 412, in 97 families.

References 

Populated places in Sarab County